The pink-throated twinspot (Hypargos margaritatus) is a small seed-eating bird in the family Estrildidae. It inhabits dry savanna and moist, subtropical/tropical (lowland) shrubland habitats near the southeast African coast in Mozambique, South Africa and Eswatini.  It has a large range, with an estimated global extent of occurrence of 160,000 km2.

References

External links

 Pink-throated twinspot - Species text in The Atlas of Southern African Birds.

pink-throated twinspot
Birds of Southern Africa
pink-throated twinspot